Hajjiabad (also Romanized as Ḩājjīābād and Ḩājīābād; also known as Ḩājjīābād-e Zereshkeh) is a village in Hemmatabad Rural District, in the Central District of Borujerd County, Lorestan Province, Iran. At the 2006 census, its population was 751, in 179 families.

References 

Towns and villages in Borujerd County